David Howell Petraeus  (born November 7, 1952) is a retired United States Army general and public official. He served as Director of the Central Intelligence Agency from September 6, 2011, until his resignation on November 9, 2012. Prior to his assuming the directorship of the CIA, Petraeus served 37 years in the United States Army. His last assignments in the Army were as commander of the International Security Assistance Force (ISAF) and commander, U.S. Forces – Afghanistan (USFOR-A) from July 4, 2010, to July 18, 2011. His other four-star assignments include serving as the 10th commander, U.S. Central Command (USCENTCOM) from October 13, 2008, to June 30, 2010, and as commanding general, Multi-National Force – Iraq (MNF-I) from February 10, 2007, to September 16, 2008. As commander of MNF-I, Petraeus oversaw all coalition forces in Iraq.

Petraeus was the General George C. Marshall Award winner as the top graduate of the U.S. Army Command and General Staff College class of 1983. He later served as assistant professor of international relations at the United States Military Academy and also completed a fellowship at Georgetown University.

Petraeus has repeatedly stated that he has no plans to run for elected political office. On June 23, 2010, President Barack Obama nominated Petraeus to succeed General Stanley McChrystal as commanding general of the International Security Assistance Force in Afghanistan, technically a step down from his position as Commander of United States Central Command, which oversees the military efforts in Afghanistan, Pakistan, Central Asia, the Arabian Peninsula, and Egypt.

On June 30, 2011, Petraeus was unanimously confirmed as the Director of the CIA by the U.S. Senate 94–0. Petraeus relinquished command of U.S. and NATO forces in Afghanistan on July 18, 2011, and retired from the U.S. Army on August 31, 2011. On November 9, 2012, he resigned from his position as director of the CIA, citing his extramarital affair with his biographer Paula Broadwell, which was reportedly discovered in the course of an FBI investigation. In January 2015, officials reported the FBI and Justice Department prosecutors had recommended bringing felony charges against Petraeus for allegedly providing classified information to Broadwell while serving as director of the CIA. Eventually, Petraeus pleaded guilty to one misdemeanor charge of mishandling classified information. He was later sentenced to two years of probation and fined $100,000 for the unauthorized removal and retention of classified material he gave to Broadwell.

Early life and family
Petraeus was born in Cornwall-on-Hudson, New York, the son of Miriam Sweet (née Howell; 1912–1991), a librarian, and Sixtus Petraeus (1915–2008), a sea captain. His father was a Dutch merchant mariner who emigrated to the United States at the start of World War II, from Franeker, the Netherlands, and his mother was American, a resident of Brooklyn, New York. They met at the Seamen's Church Institute of New York and New Jersey and married. Sixtus Petraeus commanded a Liberty ship for the U.S. for the duration of World War II. The family moved after the war, settling in Cornwall-on-Hudson, where David Petraeus grew up and graduated from Cornwall Central High School in 1970.

Petraeus went on to the United States Military Academy at West Point. Petraeus was on the intercollegiate soccer and ski teams, was a cadet captain on the brigade staff, and was a "distinguished cadet" academically, graduating in the top 5% of the Class of 1974 (ranked 40th overall). In the class yearbook, Petraeus was remembered as "always going for it in sports, academics, leadership, and even his social life."

While a cadet, Petraeus started dating the daughter of Army General William A. Knowlton (the West Point superintendent at the time), Holly. Two months after Petraeus graduated, they married. Holly, who is multi-lingual, was a National Merit Scholar in high school, and graduated summa cum laude from Dickinson College. They have a daughter and son, Anne and Stephen. Petraeus administered the oath of office at his son's 2009 commissioning into the Army after his son's graduation from the Massachusetts Institute of Technology. His son went on to serve as an officer in Afghanistan as a member of 3rd Platoon, Alpha Company, 1st Battalion, 503rd Infantry Regiment, 173rd Airborne Brigade Combat Team.

Petraeus's official residence in the United States is a small property in the small town of Springfield, New Hampshire, which his wife inherited from her family. Petraeus once told a friend that he was a Rockefeller Republican.

Education and academia
Petraeus graduated from West Point in 1974, receiving a B.S. degree in Military Science. He earned the General George C. Marshall Award as the top graduate of the U.S. Army Command and General Staff College Class of 1983 at Fort Leavenworth, Kansas. He subsequently earned an M.P.A. degree in 1985 and a Ph.D. in international relations in 1987 from Princeton University's Woodrow Wilson School of Public and International Affairs, where he was mentored by Richard H. Ullman. 

At that time, he also served as an assistant professor of international relations at the U.S. Military Academy from 1985 to 1987. His doctoral dissertation was titled "The American Military and the Lessons of Vietnam: A Study of Military Influence and the Use of Force in the Post-Vietnam Era". He completed a military fellowship at Georgetown University's Edmund A. Walsh School of Foreign Service in 1994–1995, although he was called away early to serve in Haiti as the Chief of Operations for NATO there in early 1995.

From late 2005 through February 2007, Petraeus served as commanding general of Fort Leavenworth, Kansas, and the U.S. Army Combined Arms Center (CAC) located there. As commander of CAC, Petraeus was responsible for oversight of the Command and General Staff College and seventeen other schools, centers, and training programs as well as for developing the Army's doctrinal manuals, training the Army's officers, and supervising the Army's center for the collection and dissemination of lessons learned. During his time at CAC, Petraeus and Marine Lt. Gen. James N. Mattis jointly oversaw the publication of Field Manual 3–24, Counterinsurgency, the body of which was written by an extraordinarily diverse group of military officers, academics, human rights advocates, and journalists who had been assembled by Petraeus and Mattis. 

At both Fort Leavenworth and throughout the military's schools and training programs, Petraeus integrated the study of counterinsurgency into lesson plans and training exercises. In recognition of the fact that soldiers in Iraq often performed duties far different from those for which they trained, Petraeus stressed the importance of teaching soldiers how to think and how to fight, and the need to foster flexibility and adaptability in leaders. 

Petraeus called this change the most significant part of The Surge, saying in 2016, "the surge that mattered most was the surge of ideas. It was the change of strategy, and in many respects, this represented quite a significant change to what it was we were doing before the surge." Petraeus has been called "the world's leading expert in counter-insurgency warfare". Later, having refined his ideas on counterinsurgency based on the implementation of the new counterinsurgency doctrine in Iraq, he published both in Iraq as well as in the Sep/Oct 2008 edition of Military Review his "Commander's Counterinsurgency Guidance" to help guide leaders and units in the Multi-National Force-Iraq.

Military operations

1970s
Upon his graduation from West Point in 1974, Petraeus was commissioned an infantry officer. After completing Ranger School (Distinguished Honor Graduate and other honors), Petraeus was assigned to the 509th Airborne Battalion Combat Team, a light infantry unit stationed in Vicenza, Italy. Ever since, light infantry has been at the core of his career, punctuated by assignments to mechanized units, unit commands, staff assignments, and educational institutions. After leaving the 509th as a first lieutenant, Petraeus began a brief association with mechanized units when he became assistant operations officer on the staff of the 2nd Brigade, 24th Infantry Division (Mechanized), at Fort Stewart, Georgia. In 1979, he assumed command of a company in the same division: A Company, 2nd Battalion, 19th Infantry Regiment (Mechanized), and then served as that battalion's operations officer, a major's position that he held as a junior captain.

1980s
In 1981, Petraeus became aide-de-camp to General John Galvin, then commanding general of the 24th Infantry Division (Mechanized). He spent the next few years furthering his military and civilian education, including spending 1982–83 at Fort Leavenworth, Kansas, attending the Command and General Staff College. At graduation in 1983, he was the General George C. Marshall Award winner as the top graduate of the U.S. Army Command and General Staff College. From 1983 to 1985, he was at Princeton; and 1985–87 at West Point. 

After earning his Ph.D. and teaching at West Point, Petraeus continued up the rungs of the command ladder, serving as military assistant to Gen. John Galvin, the Supreme Allied Commander in Europe. From there, he moved to the 3rd Infantry Division (Mechanized). During 1988–1989, he served as operations officer to the 3rd Infantry Division (Mechanized)'s 30th Infantry Regiment. He was then posted as an aide and assistant executive officer to the U.S. Army Chief of Staff, General Carl Vuono, in Washington, D.C.

1990s
Upon promotion to lieutenant colonel, Petraeus moved from the office of the chief of staff to Fort Campbell, Kentucky, where he commanded the 101st Airborne Division (Air Assault)'s 3rd Battalion 187th Infantry Regiment, known as the "Iron Rakkasans", from 1991 to 1993. During this period, he suffered one of the more dramatic incidents in his career; in 1991 he was accidentally shot in the chest with an M-16 rifle during a live-fire exercise when a soldier tripped and his rifle discharged. He was taken to Vanderbilt University Medical Center, Nashville, Tennessee, where he was operated on by future U.S. Senator Bill Frist. The hospital released him early after he did fifty push-ups without resting, just a few days after the accident.

During 1993–94, Petraeus continued his long association with the 101st Airborne Division (Air Assault) as the division's assistant chief of staff, G-3 (plans, operations, and training) and installation director of plans, training, and mobilization (DPTM). In 1995, he was assigned to the United Nations Mission in Haiti Military Staff as its chief operations officer during Operation Uphold Democracy. His next command, from 1995 to 1997, was the 1st Brigade, 82nd Airborne Division, centered on the 504th Parachute Infantry Regiment. At that post, his brigade's training cycle at Fort Polk's Joint Readiness Training Center for low-intensity warfare was chronicled by novelist and military enthusiast Tom Clancy in his book Airborne.

From 1997 to 1999, Petraeus served in the Pentagon as executive assistant to the director of the Joint Staff and then to the Chairman of the Joint Chiefs, Gen. Henry Shelton, who described Petraeus as "a high-energy individual who likes to lead from the front, in any field, he is going into." In 1999, as a brigadier general, Petraeus returned to the 82nd, serving as the assistant division commander for operations and then, briefly, as acting commanding general. During his time with the 82nd, he deployed to Kuwait as part of Operation Desert Spring, the continuous rotation of combat forces through Kuwait during the decade after the Gulf War.

2000s
From the 82nd, he moved on to serve as chief of staff of XVIII Airborne Corps at Fort Bragg during 2000–2001. In 2000, Petraeus suffered his second major injury, when, during a civilian skydiving jump, his parachute collapsed at low altitude due to a hook turn, resulting in a hard landing that broke his pelvis. He was selected for promotion to major general in 2001. During 2001–2002, as a brigadier general, Petraeus served a ten-month tour in Bosnia and Herzegovina as part of Operation Joint Forge. In Bosnia, he was the NATO Stabilization Force assistant chief of staff for operations as well as the deputy commander of the U.S. Joint Interagency Counter-Terrorism Task Force, a command created after the September 11 attacks to add counterterrorism capability to the U.S. forces attached to the NATO command in Bosnia. In 2004, he was promoted to lieutenant general. 

In 2007, he was promoted to General. On April 23, 2008, Secretary of Defense Gates announced that President Bush was nominating General Petraeus to command U.S. Central Command (USCENTCOM), headquartered in Tampa, Florida. In 2010, Petraeus was nominated to command the International Security Assistance Force in Afghanistan, which required Senate confirmation. He was confirmed on June 30, 2010, and took over command from temporary commander Lieutenant-General Sir Nick Parker on July 4, 2010.

Involvement in the Iraq War

101st Airborne Division

In 2003, Petraeus, then a major general, saw combat for the first time when he commanded the 101st Airborne Division during V Corps's drive to Baghdad. In a campaign chronicled in detail by Pulitzer Prize-winning author Rick Atkinson of The Washington Post in the book In the Company of Soldiers, Petraeus led his division through fierce fighting south of Baghdad, in Karbala, Hilla and Najaf. Following the fall of Baghdad, the division conducted the longest heliborne assault on record in order to reach Nineveh Governorate, where it would spend much of 2003. The 1st Brigade was responsible for the area south of Mosul, the 2nd Brigade for the city itself, and the 3rd Brigade for the region stretching toward the Syrian border. An often-repeated story of Petraeus's time with the 101st is his asking of embedded The Washington Post reporter Rick Atkinson to "Tell me how this ends", an anecdote he and other journalists have used to portray Petraeus as an early recognizer of the difficulties that would follow the fall of Baghdad.

In Mosul, a city of nearly two million people, Petraeus and the 101st employed classic counterinsurgency methods to build security and stability, including conducting targeted kinetic operations and using force judiciously, jump-starting the economy, building local security forces, staging elections for the city council within weeks of their arrival, overseeing a program of public works, reinvigorating the political process, and launching 4,500 reconstruction projects in Iraq. 

This approach can be attributed to Petraeus, who had been steeped in nation-building during his previous tours in nations such as Bosnia and Haiti and thus approached nation-building as a central military mission and who was "prepared to act while the civilian authority in Baghdad was still getting organized", according to Michael Gordon of The New York Times. Some Iraqis gave Petraeus the nickname 'King David', which was later adopted by some of his colleagues. In 2004, Newsweek stated that "It's widely accepted that no force worked harder to win Iraqi hearts and minds than the 101st Airborne Division led by Petraeus."

One of the General's major public works was the restoration and re-opening of the University of Mosul. Petraeus strongly supported the use of commanders' discretionary funds for public works, telling Coalition Provisional Authority director L. Paul Bremer "Money is ammunition" during the director's first visit to Mosul. Petraeus's often repeated catchphrase was later incorporated into official military briefings and was also eventually incorporated into the U.S. Army Counterinsurgency Field Manual drafted with Petraeus's oversight.

In February 2004, the 101st was replaced in Mosul by a portion of I Corps headquarters, but operational forces consisted solely of a unit roughly one quarter its size—a Stryker brigade. The following summer, the governor of Nineveh Province was assassinated, and most of the Sunni Arab Provincial Council members walked out in the ensuing selection of the new governor, leaving Kurdish members in charge of a predominantly Sunni Arab province. Later that year, the local police commander defected to the Kurdish Minister of Interior in Irbil after repeated assassination attempts against him, attacks on his house, and the kidnapping of his sister. The largely Sunni Arab police collapsed under insurgent attacks launched at the same time Coalition Forces attacked Fallujah in November 2004.

There are differing explanations for the apparent collapse of the police force in Mosul. The Guardian quoted an anonymous U.S. diplomat saying, "Mosul basically collapsed after he [Petraeus] left." Former diplomat Peter Galbraith criticized Petraeus's command of the 101st, saying his achievements had been exaggerated and his reputation inflated. He wrote for The New York Review of Books that "Petraeus ignored warnings from America's Kurdish allies that he was appointing the wrong people to key positions in Mosul's local government and police." 

On the other hand, in the book Fiasco, The Washington Post reporter Tom Ricks wrote that "Mosul was quiet while he (Petraeus) was there, and likely would have remained so had his successor had as many troops as he had—and as much understanding of counterinsurgency techniques." Ricks went on to say that "the population-oriented approach Petraeus took in Mosul in 2003 would be the one the entire U.S. Army in Iraq was trying to adopt in 2006." 

Time columnist Joe Klein largely agreed with Ricks, writing that the Stryker brigade that replaced the 101st "didn't do any of the local governance that Petraeus had done." Moving away from counterinsurgency principles, "they were occupiers, not builders". The New York Times reporter Michael Gordon and retired General Bernard Trainor echoed Ricks and Klein, including in their book Cobra II a quote that Petraeus "did it right and won over Mosul."

Multi-National Security Transition Command – Iraq
In June 2004, less than six months after the 101st returned to the U.S., Petraeus was promoted to lieutenant general and became the first commander of the Multi-National Security Transition Command - Iraq. This newly created command had responsibility for training, equipping, and mentoring Iraq's growing army, police, and other security forces, as well as developing Iraq's security institutions and building associated infrastructure, such as training bases, police stations, and border forts.

During Petraeus's fifteen months at the helm of MNSTC-I, he stood up a three-star command virtually from scratch and in the midst of serious fighting in places like Fallujah, Mosul, and Najaf. By the end of his command, some 100,000 Iraqi Security Forces had been trained; Iraqi Army and Police were being employed in combat; countless reconstruction projects had been executed; and hundreds of thousands of weapons, body armor, and other equipment had been distributed in what was described as the "largest military procurement and distribution effort since World War II", at a cost of over $11 billion.

In September 2004, Petraeus wrote an article for The Washington Post in which he described the tangible progress being made in building Iraq's security forces from the ground up while also noting the many challenges associated with doing so. "Although there have been reverses – not to mention horrific terrorist attacks," Petraeus wrote, "there has been progress in the effort to enable Iraqis to shoulder more of the load for their own security, something they are keen to do." 

Some of the challenges involved in building security forces had to do with accomplishing this task in the midst of a tough insurgency—or, as Petraeus wrote, "making the mission akin to repairing an aircraft while in flight—and while being shot at." Other challenges included allegations of corruption as well as efforts to improve Iraq's supply accountability procedures. For example, according to former Interim Iraq Governing Council member Ali A. Allawi in The Occupation of Iraq: Winning the War, Losing the Peace, "under the very noses of the security transition command, officials both inside and outside the ministry of defense were planning to embezzle most, if not all, of the procurement budget of the army." The Washington Post stated in August 2007 that the Pentagon had lost track of approximately 30% of weapons supplied to the Iraqi security forces. The General Accounting Office said that the weapons distribution was haphazard, rushed, and did not follow established procedures—particularly from 2004 to 2005, when security training was led by Petraeus and Iraq's security forces began to see combat in places like Najaf and Samarra. 

Over a hundred thousand AK-47 assault rifles and pistols were delivered to Iraqi forces without full documentation, and some of the missing weapons may have been abducted by Iraqi insurgents. Thousands of body armour pieces have also been lost. The Independent has stated that the military believed "the situation on the ground was so urgent, and the agency responsible for recording the transfers of arms so short-staffed, that field commanders had little choice in the matter." The Pentagon conducted its own investigation, and accountability was subsequently regained for many of the weapons.

Following his second tour in Iraq, Petraeus authored a widely read article in Military Review, listing fourteen observations he had made during two tours in Iraq, including: do not do too much with your own hands, money is ammunition, increasing the number of stakeholders is critical to success, success in a counterinsurgency requires more than just military operations, ultimate success depends on local leaders, there is no substitute for flexible and adaptable leaders, and, finally, a leader's most important task is to set the right tone.

Multi-National Force – Iraq (spring 2007)

The intervening time between the Iraq commands was spent at Fort Leavenworth, where Petraeus further developed his military doctrine and pursued an important White House contact in Meghan O'Sullivan who was the principal adviser to the president on the war. In January 2007, as part of his overhauled Iraq strategy, President George W. Bush announced that Petraeus would succeed Gen. George Casey as commanding general of MNF-I to lead all U.S. troops in Iraq. In his memoirs, President Bush likened his selection of Petraeus to the elevations of other great generals of American history, writing, "Lincoln discovered Generals Grant and Sherman.  Roosevelt had Eisenhower and Bradley.  I found David Petraeus and Ray Odierno." 

On January 23, the Senate Armed Services Committee held Petraeus's nomination hearing, during which he testified on his ideas for Iraq, particularly the strategy underpinning the "surge" of forces. During his opening statement, Petraeus stated that "security of the population, especially in Baghdad, and in partnership with the Iraqi Security Forces, will be the focus of the military effort." He went on to state that security would require establishing a persistent presence, especially in Iraq's most threatened neighborhoods. He also noted the critical importance of helping Iraq increase its governmental capacity, develop employment programs, and improve daily life for its citizens.

Throughout Petraeus's tenure in Iraq, Multi-National Force-Iraq endeavored to work with the Government of Iraq to carry out this strategy that focused on securing the population. Doing so required establishing—and maintaining—persistent presence by living among the population, separating reconcilable Iraqis from irreconcilable enemies, relentlessly pursuing the enemy, taking back sanctuaries and then holding areas that had been cleared, and continuing to develop Iraq's security forces and to support local security forces, often called Sons of Iraq, and integrate them into the Iraqi Army and Police and other employment programs.

The strategy underpinning the "surge" of forces, as well as the ideas Petraeus included in U.S. Army Field Manual 3–24, Counterinsurgency, have been referred to by some journalists and politicians as the "Petraeus Doctrine," although the surge itself was proposed a few months before Petraeus took command. Despite the misgivings of most Democratic and a few Republican senators over the proposed implementation of the "Petraeus Doctrine" in Iraq, specifically regarding the troop surge, Petraeus was unanimously confirmed as a four-star general and MNF-I commander on January 27.

Before leaving for Iraq, Petraeus recruited a number of highly educated military officers, nicknamed "Petraeus guys" or "designated thinkers," to advise him as commander, including Col. Mike Meese, head of the Social Sciences Department at West Point and Col. H.R. McMaster, famous for his leadership at the Battle of 73 Easting in the Gulf War and in the pacification of Tal Afar more recently, as well as for his doctoral dissertation on Vietnam-era civil-military relations titled Dereliction of Duty. While most of Petraeus's closest advisers were American military officers, he also hired Lt. Col. David Kilcullen of the Australian Army, who was working for the U.S. State Department. Kilcullen upon his return from Iraq published The Accidental Guerrilla, and has discussed the central front of the war and lessons learned in Iraq in The Washington Post.

After taking command of MNF-I on February 10, 2007, Petraeus inspected U.S. and Iraqi units all over Iraq, visiting outposts in greater Baghdad, Tikrit, Baquba, Ramadi, Mosul, Kirkuk, Bayji, Samarra, Basrah and as far west as al-Hit and Al Qaim. In April 2007, Petraeus made his first visit to Washington as MNF-I Commander, reporting to President Bush and Congress on the progress of the "surge" and the overall situation in Iraq. During this visit he met privately with members of Congress and reportedly argued against setting a timetable for U.S. troop withdrawal from Iraq.

By late May 2007, Congress had not imposed any timetables in war funding legislation for troop withdrawal. The enacted legislation did mandate that Petraeus and the U.S. Ambassador to Iraq, Ryan Crocker, deliver a report to Congress by September 15, 2007, detailing their assessment of the military, economic and political situation of Iraq.

In June 2007, Petraeus stated in an interview that there were "astonishing signs of normalcy" in Baghdad, and this comment drew criticism from Senate majority leader Harry Reid. In the same interview, however, Petraeus stated that "many problems remain" and he noted the need to help the Iraqis "stitch back together the fabric of society that was torn during the height of sectarian violence" in late 2006. Petraeus also warned that he expected that the situation in Iraq would require the continued deployment of the elevated troop level of more than 150,000 beyond September 2007; he also stated that U.S. involvement in Iraq could last years afterward. 

These statements are representative of the fact that throughout their time in Iraq, Petraeus and Crocker remained circumspect and refused to classify themselves as optimists or pessimists, noting, instead, that they were realists and that the reality in Iraq was very hard. They also repeatedly emphasized the importance of forthright reports and an unvarnished approach. Indeed, Petraeus's realistic approach and assessments were lauded during the McLaughlin Group's 2008 Year-End Awards, when Monica Crowley nominated Petraeus for the most honest person of the year, stating, "[H]e spoke about the great successes of the surge in Iraq, but he always tempered it, never sugar-coated it."

Multi-National Force – Iraq (summer and fall 2007)
In July 2007, the White House submitted to Congress the interim report on Iraq, which stated that coalition forces had made satisfactory progress on 6 of 18 benchmarks set by Congress. On September 7, 2007, in a letter addressed to the troops he was commanding, Petraeus wrote that much military progress had been made, but that the national-level political progress that was hoped for had not been achieved. Petraeus's Report to Congress on the Situation in Iraq was delivered to Congress on September 10, 2007.

On August 15, 2007, the Los Angeles Times had stated that, according to unnamed administration officials, the report "would actually be written by the White House, with inputs from officials throughout the government." However, Petraeus declared in his testimony to Congress that "I wrote this testimony myself." He further elaborated that his testimony to Congress "has not been cleared by, nor shared with, anyone in the Pentagon, the White House, or Congress."

In his September Congressional testimony, Petraeus stated, "As a bottom line up front, the military objectives of the surge are, in large measure, being met." He cited numerous factors for this progress, to include the fact that Coalition and Iraqi Forces had dealt significant blows to Al-Qaeda Iraq and had disrupted Shia militias, that ethno-sectarian violence had been reduced, and that the tribal rejection of Al-Qaeda had spread from Anbar Province to numerous other locations across Iraq. Based on this progress and additional progress expected to be achieved, Petraeus recommended drawing down the surge forces from Iraq and gradually transitioning increased responsibilities to Iraqi Forces, as their capabilities and conditions on the ground permitted.

Democratic Senate Majority Leader Harry Reid of Nevada argued Petraeus's "plan is just more of the same" and "is neither a drawdown or a change in mission that we need." Democratic Representative Robert Wexler of Florida accused Petraeus of "cherry-picking statistics" and "massaging information." Chairman of the House Foreign Affairs Committee Tom Lantos of California called Petraeus and U.S. Ambassador to Iraq Ryan Crocker "two of our nation's most capable public servants" and said Democrats feel "esteem for their professionalism." But he also said that "We can no longer take their assertions on Iraq at face value"; concluding, "We need to get out of Iraq, for that country's sake as well as our own."

Republican Presidential candidate Duncan Hunter called the report "a candid, independent assessment given with integrity." Republican senator Jon Kyl of Arizona stated, "I commend General Petraeus for his honest and forthright assessment of the situation in Iraq." Anti-war Republican senator Chuck Hagel of Nebraska criticized the report while praising Petraeus, saying "It's not your fault, general. ... It's not Ambassador Crocker's fault. It's this administration's fault." A USA Today/Gallup poll taken after Petraeus's report to Congress showed virtually no change in negative public opinion toward the war. A Pew Research Center survey, however, found that most Americans who had heard about the report approved of Petraeus's recommendations.

On September 20, the Senate passed an amendment by Republican John Cornyn III of Texas designed to "strongly condemn personal attacks on the honor and integrity of General Petraeus." Cornyn drafted the amendment in response to a controversial full-page ad by the liberal group Moveon.org in the September 10, 2007, edition of The New York Times. All forty-nine Republican senators and twenty-two Democratic senators voted in support. The House passed a similar resolution by a 341–79 vote on September 26.

In December 2007, The Washington Post "Fact Checker" stated that "While some of Petraeus's statistics are open to challenge, his claims about a general reduction in violence have been borne out over subsequent months. It now looks as if Petraeus was broadly right on this issue at least."

Based on the conditions on the ground, in October 2007, Petraeus and U.S. Ambassador to Iraq Ryan Crocker revised their campaign plan for Iraq. In recognition of the progress made against Al Qaeda Iraq, one of the major points would be "shifting the U.S. military effort to focus more on countering Shiite militias."

Multi-National Force – Iraq (spring 2008)
On February 18, 2008, USA Today stated that "the U.S. effort has shown more success" and that, after the number of troops reached its peak in fall 2007, "U.S. deaths were at their lowest levels since the 2003 invasion, civilian casualties were down, and street life was resuming in Baghdad." In light of the significant reduction in violence and as the surge brigades began to redeploy without replacement, Petraeus characterized the progress as tenuous, fragile, and reversible and repeatedly reminded all involved that much work remained to be done. During an early February trip to Iraq, Defense Secretary Robert Gates endorsed the idea of a period of consolidation and evaluation upon completion of the withdrawal of surge brigades from Iraq.

Petraeus and Crocker continued these themes at their two full days of testimony before Congress on April 8 and 9. During his opening statement, Petraeus stated that "there has been significant but uneven security progress in Iraq", while also noting that "the situation in certain areas is still unsatisfactory and that innumerable challenges remain" and that "the progress made since last spring is fragile and reversible." He also recommended a continuation of the drawdown of surge forces as well as a 45-day period of consolidation and evaluation after the final surge brigade had redeployed in late July. Analysts for USA Today and The New York Times stated that the hearings "lacked the suspense of last September's debate," but they did include sharp questioning as well as both skepticism and praise from various Congressional leaders.

In late May 2008, the Senate Armed Services Committee held nomination hearings for Petraeus and Lieutenant General Ray Odierno to lead United States Central Command and Multi-National Force-Iraq, respectively. During the hearings, Committee Chairman Carl Levin praised these two men, stating that "we owe Gen. Petraeus and Gen. Odierno a debt of gratitude for the commitment, determination and strength that they brought to their areas of responsibility. And regardless of how long the administration may choose to remain engaged in the strife in that country, our troops are better off with the leadership these two distinguished soldiers provide." 

During his opening statement, Petraeus discussed four principles that would guide his efforts if confirmed as CENTCOM Commander: seeking to strengthen international partnerships; taking a "whole of government" approach; pursuing comprehensive efforts and solutions; and, finally, both supporting efforts in Iraq and Afghanistan and ensuring readiness for possible contingency operations in the future. Petraeus also noted that during the week before his testimony, the number of security incidents in Iraq was the lowest in over four years. After Petraeus's return to Baghdad, and despite the continued drawdown of surge forces as well as recent Iraqi-led operations in places like Basrah, Mosul, and Baghdad, the number of security incidents in Iraq remained at their lowest level in over four years.

Multi-National Force – Iraq (summer and fall 2008)

In September 2008, Petraeus gave an interview to BBC News stating that he did not think using the term "victory" in describing the Iraq war was appropriate, saying "This is not the sort of struggle where you take a hill, plant the flag and go home to a victory parade ... it's not war with a simple slogan."

Petraeus had discussed the term 'victory' before in March 2008, saying to NPR News that "an Iraq that is at peace with itself, at peace with its neighbors, that has a government that is representative of—and responsive to—its citizenry and is a contributing member of the global community" could arguably be called 'victory'. On the eve of his change of command, in September 2008, Petraeus stated that "I don't use terms like victory or defeat ... I'm a realist, not an optimist or a pessimist. And the reality is that there has been significant progress but there are still serious challenges."

Change of command

On September 16, 2008, Petraeus formally gave over his command in Iraq to General Raymond T. Odierno in a government ceremony presided by Defense Secretary Robert Gates. During the ceremony, Gates stated that Petraeus "played a historic role" and created the "translation of a great strategy into a great success in very difficult circumstances." Gates also told Petraeus he believed "history will regard you as one of our nation's greatest battle captains." He presented Petraeus with the Defense Distinguished Service Medal. At the event, Petraeus mentioned the difficulty in getting the Sons of Iraq absorbed into the central Government of Iraq and warned about future consequences if the effort stalled. 

When speaking of these and other challenges, Petraeus noted that "the gains [achieved in Iraq] are tenuous and unlikely to survive without an American effort that outlasts his tenure." Even so, as Petraeus departed Iraq, it appeared to many that he was leaving a much different Iraq than the one that existed when he took command in February 2007. As described by Dexter Filkins, "violence has plummeted from its apocalyptic peaks, Iraqi leaders are asserting themselves, and streets that once seemed dead are flourishing with life." The January 3, 2009, Iraq Trends (a chart produced weekly by the MNF-I) seemed to illustrate an increase in incidents followed by the sharp decline described by Dexter Filkens and others.

Petraeus' command of coalition forces during the Surge in Iraq was lauded by a number of observers. In his book The Savior Generals historian Victor Davis Hanson wrote, "that without David Petraeus, the American effort in Iraq—along with the reputation of the U.S. military in the Middle East—would have been lost long ago." In her introduction of Petraeus at the Baccalaureate ceremony for the Class of 2009 at Princeton University, President Shirley Tilghman described his accomplishments. While acknowledging that much remained to be accomplished in Iraq, Tilghman paid tribute to Petraeus's "leadership in rethinking American military strategy through his principles of counterinsurgency," which are, she said, "eliminating 'simplistic definitions of victory and defeat in favor of incremental and nuanced progress.'"

U.S. Central Command (fall 2008 to summer 2010)

On October 31, 2008, Petraeus assumed command of the United States Central Command (USCENTCOM) headquartered in Tampa, Florida. Petraeus was responsible for U.S. operations in 20 countries spreading from Egypt to Pakistan—including Operations Iraqi Freedom and Enduring Freedom. During his time at CENTCOM, Petraeus advocated that countering the terrorist threats in the CENTCOM region required more than just counter-terrorism forces, demanding instead whole-of-government, comprehensive approaches akin to those of counterinsurgency. One of his closest colleagues said that Petraeus knew that defeating an insurgency required living among the people, convincing them that we were better than the insurgents.  "[Y]ou can't kill 'em all ... [Y]ou can't kill your way out of an insurgency. ... You have to find other kinds of ammunition, and it's not always a bullet."

Petraeus reiterated this view in a 2009 interview published in Parade magazine. In an interview for Newsweek magazine's "Interview Issue: The View From People Who Make a Difference," Petraeus expressed his support for President Obama's announced Afghanistan strategy and discussed his view that reconciliation efforts in Afghanistan should for the time being occur "at the lower and midlevels."

In mid-August 2009, Petraeus established the Afghanistan-Pakistan Center of Excellence within the USCENTCOM Directorate of Intelligence to provide leadership to coordinate, integrate and focus analysis efforts in support of operations in Afghanistan and Pakistan.

During a February 2010 World Affairs Council event in Philadelphia, General Petraeus discussed the ways in which diplomacy, history, and culture impact overall military strategy, then explained how these issues informed the U.S. approach to counterinsurgencies in Iraq and Afghanistan.

On March 16, 2010, in testimony to the Senate Armed Services Committee, Petraeus described the continuing Israeli–Palestinian conflict as a challenge to U.S. interests in the region. According to the testimony, the conflict was "fomenting anti-American sentiment" due to "a perception of U.S. favoritism for Israel." This was widely commented on in the media. When questioned by journalist Philip Klein, Petraeus said the original reporter "picked apart" and "spun" his speech. He said he believed there were many important factors standing in the way of peace, including "a whole bunch of extremist organizations, some of which by the way deny Israel's right to exist. There's a country that has a nuclear program who denies that the Holocaust took place. So again we have all these factors in there. This [Israel] is just one."

In March 2010, Petraeus visited the New Hampshire Institute of Politics at Saint Anselm College to speak about Iraq and Afghanistan. Petraeus spoke a few days after the seventh anniversary of the U.S. invasion of Iraq, noting the successful changes in Iraq since the U.S. troop surge. The visit to Saint Anselm created rumors that Petraeus was contemplating a run for the presidency; however, he denied the speculation, saying that he was not aware that the college had been the site of numerous presidential debates.

Toward the close of his tenure as CENTCOM Commander, including in his interview published in Vanity Fair, Petraeus discussed the effort to determine and send to Afghanistan the right "inputs" for success there; these inputs included several structures and organizations that proved important in Iraq, including "an engagement cell to support reconciliation ... a finance cell to go after financing of the enemy ... [a] really robust detainee-operations task force, a rule-of-law task force, an energy-fusion cell—all these other sort of nonstandard missions that are very important."

On May 5, 2010, The New York Times published an article suggesting there was mounting evidence of a Taliban role in the Times Square bombing plot. On May 7, 2010, Petraeus announced that Times Square bombing suspect Faisal Shahzad was a "lone wolf" terrorist who did not work with others. On May 10, 2010, Attorney General Eric Holder said that the evidence showed the Pakistani Taliban directed this plot.

Health
General Petraeus was diagnosed with early-stage prostate cancer in February 2009 and underwent two months of successful radiation treatment at Walter Reed Army Medical Center. The diagnosis and treatment were not publicly disclosed until October 2009 because Petraeus and his family regarded his illness as a personal matter that did not interfere with the performance of his duties.

On June 15, 2010, Petraeus momentarily fainted while being questioned by the Senate Armed Services Committee. He quickly recovered and was able to walk and exit the room without assistance. He attributed the episode to possible dehydration.

Commander of U.S. and ISAF forces in Afghanistan (2010-2011)

On June 23, 2010, President Obama announced that he would nominate Petraeus to succeed General Stanley A. McChrystal as the commander of U.S. Forces in Afghanistan. The change of command was prompted by McChrystal's comments about the Obama administration and its policies in Afghanistan during an interview with Rolling Stone magazine. The nomination was technically a positional step down from his position as commander of Central Command; however, the President said that he believed that he was the best man for the job. After being confirmed by the Senate on June 30, Petraeus formally assumed command on July 4. 

During the assumption-of-command remarks, Petraeus provided his vision and goals to NATO, the members of his command, and his Afghan partners. As he was known to do while the commander in Iraq, Petraeus delivered his first Letter to the Troops on the same day he assumed command.

On August 1, 2010, shortly after the disclosure of the Afghan war logs on WikiLeaks, which included reports of high civilian deaths and increased Taliban attacks, Petraeus issued his updated Tactical Directive for the prevention of civilian casualties, providing guidance and intent for the use of force by the U.S. military units operating in Afghanistan (replacing the July 1, 2009, version). This directive reinforced the concept of "disciplined use of force in partnership with Afghan Security Forces" in the fight against insurgent forces.

In the October 2010 issue of Army Magazine, Petraeus discussed changes that had taken place over the previous 18 months, including sections discussing "setting the conditions for progress," "capitalizing on the conditions for progress," "improving security," "supporting governance expansion," "promoting economic development," "reducing corruption," and "our troopers: carrying out a difficult mission."

Sources interviewed by Steve Coll were critical of aspects of Petraeus's tenure as ISAF commander. Some described Petraeus as being physically exhausted from his previous tours abroad (as well as his recovery from prostate cancer), having a proclivity to see Afghanistan through the prism of his experience in Iraq—to the point of occasionally referring to Afghanistan as "Iraq"—and being slow to react to "green-on-blue" or "insider attacks" by Afghan soldiers against their American partners. Petraeus sought to recreate the "Sunni Awakening" in Iraq by offering financial inducements to former Taliban insurgents to integrate into Hamid Karzai's government, but the results were not impressive.

As commander in Afghanistan, Petraeus joined President Obama as a primary target for Osama bin Laden. After his death, documents recovered from bin Laden's compound unveiled a plot to assassinate the two men as they traveled by plane. Bin Laden's communications with a top deputy stated, "The reason for concentrating on them is that Obama is the head of infidelity and killing him automatically will make [Vice President] Biden take over the presidency. Biden is totally unprepared for that post, which will lead the U.S. into a crisis. As for Petraeus, he is the man of the hour ... and killing him would alter the war's path" in Afghanistan.

In early March 2011, Petraeus made a "rare apology" following a NATO helicopter airstrike under his command that resulted in the deaths of nine Afghan boys and the wounding of a 10th, as they gathered firewood in Eastern Afghanistan. In a statement, Petraeus apologized to the members of the Afghan government, the people of Afghanistan, and the surviving family members, and said, "These deaths should have never happened." Several journalists and observers noted the humanitarian candor in Petraeus's open regrets. Petraeus relinquished command of U.S. and NATO forces in Afghanistan on July 18, 2011. He received the Defense Distinguished Service Medal and the NATO Meritorious Service Medal for his service.

Retirement from the U.S. Army (August 2011)
Petraeus retired from the U.S. Army on August 31, 2011. His retirement ceremony was held at Joint Base Myer–Henderson Hall. During this ceremony, he was awarded the Army Distinguished Service Medal by Deputy Secretary of Defense William J. Lynn. During the ceremony, Lynn noted that Petraeus had played an important role as both a combat leader and strategist in the post-9/11 world. Lynn also cited General Petraeus's efforts in current counter insurgency strategy. 

Admiral Michael Mullen, Chairman of the Joint Chiefs of Staff in his remarks compared General Petraeus to Ulysses S. Grant, John J. Pershing, George Marshall and Dwight D. Eisenhower as one of the great battle captains of American history. With his four-star rank, Petraeus receives an annual pension of about $220,000.

Dates of rank

CIA Director (September 2011-November 2012)

On April 28, 2011, President Barack Obama announced that he had nominated Petraeus to become the new Director of the Central Intelligence Agency. The nomination was confirmed by the United States Senate 94–0 on June 30, 2011. Petraeus was sworn in at the White House on September 6 and then ceremonially sworn in by Vice President Joe Biden at CIA Headquarters in Langley, Virginia on October 11, 2011.

Petraeus's tenure at the CIA was more low profile than that of his predecessor, Leon Panetta, declining to give media interviews while director and speaking to Congress in closed sessions. He also differed from Panetta in management style, as an article in The New York Times published just days before his resignation said; Panetta "wooed the work force and often did not question operational details, [while] Petraeus is a demanding boss who does not hesitate to order substandard work redone or details of plans adjusted". Petraeus's philosophy on leadership at the time was summarized in a twelve-point article published by Newsweek on November 5, 2012.

Although Petraeus was given good marks by most observers for his work heading the CIA, during October 2012 some critics took issue with the availability of accurate information from the CIA concerning a terrorist attack in Benghazi, Libya, the month prior. On September 11 four Americans had been killed, including the ambassador, and more than thirty evacuated. Only seven of those evacuated did not work for the CIA. According to a Wall Street Journal story, other government agencies complained about being left "largely in the dark about the CIA's role," with Secretary of State Hillary Clinton telephoning Petraeus directly the night of the attacks seeking assistance. Although the "State Department believed it had a formal agreement with the CIA to provide backup security," "the CIA didn't have the same understanding about its security responsibilities," reported The Wall Street Journal.

Extramarital affair, resignation and criticism

Petraeus reportedly began an affair with Paula Broadwell, principal author of his biography, All In: The Education of General David Petraeus, after Petraeus left his ISAF command on July 18, 2011, to become CIA director. Petraeus reportedly ended the affair in the summer of 2012, around the time that he learned that Broadwell had been sending harassing emails to a longstanding family friend of the Petraeuses, Jill Kelley.

Kelley, a Florida socialite who frequently entertained senior military personnel at her and her husband's Tampa mansion, had approached an acquaintance who worked for the FBI Tampa Field Office in the late spring with regard to anonymous emails she considered threatening. The Bureau traced the emails to Broadwell, and noted that Broadwell appeared to be exchanging intimate messages with an email account belonging to Petraeus, which instigated an investigation into whether that account had been hacked into or was someone posing as Petraeus. According to an Associated Press report, rather than transmit emails to each other's inbox, which would have left a more obvious email trail, Petraeus and Broadwell left messages in a draft folder and the draft messages were then read by the other person when they logged into the same account.

Although U.S. Attorney General Eric Holder was aware that the FBI had discovered the affair, it was not until November 6, 2012, that Petraeus's nominal superior, Director of National Intelligence James R. Clapper, was advised. That same evening Clapper called Petraeus and urged him to resign. Clapper notified the White House the next day, November 7. After being briefed on November 8, President Obama summoned Petraeus to the White House where Petraeus offered his resignation. Obama accepted his resignation on November 9, and Petraeus cited his affair when announcing that same day that he would resign as CIA Director. Eventually, Petraeus pleaded guilty to a misdemeanor charge of mishandling the classified information that he provided to his mistress and biographer.

Criticism after 2012 scandal
Petraeus had a strategy to influence military conditions by using press relations, both in theater of war and in Washington, according to critics of his military career. On November 13, 2012, Reagan administration Assistant Secretary of Defense Lawrence Korb, CIA analyst and Veteran Intelligence Professionals for Sanity co-founder Ray McGovern, and investigative journalist Gareth Porter appeared on Al Jazeera English. Together they assessed the general's extensive military-media strategy, linking his writings on counterguerrilla operations and subsequent military media efforts to his downfall with his female biographer. Critics said that the Petraeus media strategy would prove damaging for American policy in the future because of omissions and distorted interpretations that Washington policymakers, other experts, and the American public accepted from Petraeus's media contacts.

Military historians have noted the absence of field records for the Iraq and Afghanistan military campaigns, but have not been personally critical of the commanders in theater. One additional aspect of Petraeus's career that has come under increased scrutiny since his affair came to light has been his lack of a direct combat record in relation to the many awards he received. In particular, his Bronze Star Medal with Valor device has been mentioned in several media reports and questioned by several former Army officers. The citation for Petraeus's Bronze Star with "V" device also notes his "leadership under fire," as does award of the Combat Action Badge, but neither provides a detailed account of his actions.

Criminal charges and probation
In January 2015, The New York Times reported that the Federal Bureau of Investigation and the Justice Department had recommended bringing felony charges against Petraeus for providing classified information to Broadwell. Petraeus denied the allegations and was reported to have had no interest in a plea deal. However, on Tuesday, March 3, 2015, the U.S. Justice Department announced that Petraeus agreed to plead guilty in federal court in Charlotte, North Carolina to a charge of unauthorized removal and retention of classified information.

In the 15-page statement of facts filed by the government along with the plea agreement, the government stated that Petraeus had provided Broadwell access to documents containing Top Secret Sensitive Compartmented Information, had later moved those documents to his personal residence and stored them in an unsecured drawer, and had deliberately and intentionally lied to Federal investigators about both providing Broadwell access to the documents and their improper storage. These facts were acknowledged to be true by Petraeus as part of his plea agreement.

On April 23, 2015, a federal judge sentenced Petraeus to two years' probation plus a fine of $100,000. The fine was more than double the amount the Justice Department had requested.

Press accounts in January 2016 indicated that Department of Defense staff were reviewing Department of Justice documents from the Petraeus prosecution and considering whether to recommend to the Secretary of Defense that Petraeus be demoted on the Army's retired list. Laws and regulations indicate that members of the military are retired at the last rank in which they are deemed to have served successfully; Petraeus's admission of an extramarital affair and guilty plea with regard to removing and retaining classified information while serving in the grade of general could be grounds for reduction in rank to lieutenant general. The matter was reviewed by then-Secretary of the Army John M. McHugh before he left office in October 2015; he recommended no further action. On January 29, press accounts indicated that Stephen C. Hedger, Assistant Secretary of Defense for Legislative Affairs, had written to the U.S. Senate Armed Services Committee. In his letter, Hedger informed the committee that Secretary of Defense Ashton Carter had concurred with the Army's recommendation, and would not impose any further punishment on Petraeus.

Activities in retirement
In March 2013, Petraeus accepted the role of honorary chairman of the OSS Society.

Petraeus was named a visiting professor at Macaulay Honors College at the City University of New York in July 2013. According to a statement from Petraeus, "I look forward to leading a seminar at Macaulay that examines the developments that could position the United States—and our North American partners—to lead the world out of the current global economic slowdown." After his anticipated $200,000 salary for the academic year drew fire from critics, Petraeus agreed to take on the teaching position for just $1 in order to keep the focus on the students and away from any monetary controversy. In September 2013 Petraeus was harassed by students at CUNY while walking on campus.

On May 1, 2013, the University of Southern California named David Petraeus as a Judge Widney Professor, "a title reserved for eminent individuals from the arts, sciences, professions, business and community and national leadership". The president of the Currahee board of trustees announced May 6, 2013, that Petraeus agreed to serve on the board of trustees that preserves Camp Toccoa. During WWII, four of the main parachute infantry regiments of the Army trained at Camp Toccoa prior to their deployment.

Kohlberg Kravis Roberts & Co. L.P., a New York investment firm, hired Petraeus as chairman of the firm's newly created KKR Global Institute in May 2013. Part of his work would support KKR's investment teams and portfolio companies when studying new investments, especially in new locations. In December 2014, Petraeus was named a partner at KKR and remains chairman of the KKR Global Institute.

Petraeus joined the board of advisers of Team Rubicon on June 18, 2013.

Royal United Services Institute (RUSI) named Petraeus as a senior vice president of the organization in August 2013. According to RUSI, "The honorary role was created by RUSI's trustees and advisory council in recognition of General Petraeus's long association with the Institute and his distinguished contribution to the study and development of defence and international security concepts, as well as his implementation of those concepts in operations in the Balkans, Iraq, and Afghanistan."

In October 2013, Petraeus joined Harvard's John F. Kennedy School of Government as a non-resident senior fellow at the Belfer Center for Science and International Affairs. According to the school, Petraeus joined to lead a new project focusing on the technological, scientific and economic dynamics that are spurring renewed North American competitiveness. "The Coming North America Decades" project would analyze how potential policy choices could effect this ongoing transformation.  In 2016, the center announced a new project involving Petraeus and focusing on strategic leadership.

On February 10, 2014, the University of Exeter in England named Petraeus as an honorary visiting professor of the Strategy and Security Institute. Alongside the other honorary faculty, the appointment would help inform the institute's key objectives of exploring policymaking, strategy, and security.

General Petraeus was one of the "11 legendary generals" profiled in the 2014 National Geographic Channel feature "American War Generals."

In 2015, Petraeus suggested the U.S. should arm members of the terror group Al-Nusra Front (an offshoot of Al-Qaeda) in Syria to fight ISIS.

On June 10, 2016, Petraeus and Mark Kelly, a retired NASA astronaut and later Senator from Arizona, announced the creation of the gun control group Veterans Coalition for Common Sense.

Petraeus delivered the inaugural lecture in a series dedicated to his mentor and the former Dean of The Fletcher School at Tufts University, General Jack Galvin. He also delivered the inaugural lecture in a series dedicated to Admiral Stansfield Turner at the U.S. Naval War College on August 7, 2018. The lecture series honors the achievements of Turner, who served as the college's president from 1972 to 1974.

As a member of a panel discussion in October 2018 concerning a film documenting the Stars and Stripes newspaper, Petraeus shared his personal experiences with the newspaper with the audience.

On June 12, 2019, Petraeus accepted the invitation of a three-year honorary professorship in the Institute of Conflict, Cooperation and Security (ICSS) at the University of Birmingham in England. The university's announcement of the appointment stated that Petraeus "will share insights from his career with students and researchers through a variety of interactions in Birmingham and virtually."

General Petraeus was the guest speaker at the 500th Night celebration for the U.S. Military Academy's Class of 2020 at West Point, held on January 26, 2019.

Secretary of State consideration
On November 18, 2016, an article by The Guardian cited "diplomatic sources" as having said that Petraeus had entered the race for U.S. Secretary of State in the Trump administration. Petraeus confirmed his interest in the position during a BBC Radio 4 interview, stating that he would serve if asked.

Petraeus met with then President-elect Donald Trump at Trump Tower on November 28 to discuss the position and world affairs. Both Petraeus and Trump expressed favorable views of the meeting, with Trump taking to Twitter to announce, "Just met with General Petraeus—was very impressed!" Petraeus joined a short list of potential candidates for the position, including Mitt Romney and Rudy Giuliani.

There was public speculation that his nomination could hurt Trump's administration, but Republican senators John McCain and Lindsey Graham advocated for Petraeus, calling him "an extraordinary pick". Petraeus also received support from Democratic senator Dianne Feinstein, suggesting that Democrats would keep an open mind concerning his confirmation.

On December 13, 2016, Trump officially selected Rex Tillerson for the role of Secretary of State. Petraeus expressed his gratitude for Trump's consideration and deferred to former secretary of defense Robert Gates' endorsement when asked his opinion of Tillerson.

Reaction to the decision to withdraw U.S. forces from Afghanistan
On April 14, 2021, President Joe Biden announced that all U.S. troops in Afghanistan would be withdrawn from the country by September 11, 2021, against the advice of many of his top generals and many diplomats.

Petraeus has been an outspoken opponent of the U.S.'s strategy for withdrawal from Afghanistan, and the agreements made with the Taliban in preparation thereof. In a Fox News interview on August 17, 2021, Petraeus called former President Donald Trump's decision to release 5,000 detainees of the Taliban held by the Afghanistan government in 2020 flawed and disastrous, with a tragic outcome. In another interview with the Wall Street Journal on August 20, 2021, he noted that the U.S. negotiated with the Taliban expecting to get something in return for withdrawing, which, he said, "didn't work out". 

During an interview with Fox News on May 12, 2021, Petraeus discussed his opposition to the withdrawal of U.S. forces in Afghanistan, stating, "I fear that we will come to regret this decision." He warned of the possible psychological effects on Afghan forces following removal of U.S. support, the erosion of Afghan Air Force maintenance, and the risk of a "brutal civil war".

Following a military blitz by the Taliban that ended in the group capturing the country's capital, Kabul, Petraeus again questioned the poor planning of troop withdrawal from the region and reiterated the dangers the world would face from the potential establishment of Al Qaeda or the Islamic State in the Hindu Kush. In an email interview with Die Weltwoche, Petraeus stated "I do not believe that either terrorist group will pose a near-term threat to the U.S. homeland or our NATO allies. The longer-term threat will depend on our ability to identify, disrupt, and degrade any such sanctuaries." 

Petraeus suggested that the removal of 18,000 contractors who maintained aircraft contributed to the surrender of Afghan government forces who ended up lacking air support against the Taliban. In an interview with Brian Kilmeade Petraeus drew parallels between the U.S. withdrawal from Afghanistan, the Dunkirk evacuation, and the Fall of Saigon. He advised that American forces, drones, and close air support be used to secure Kabul Airport while the U.S. communicates with the Taliban to prevent them from impeding the movement of individuals that are trying to evacuate.

During a discussion with CNN's Peter Bergen, Petraeus predicted that the Taliban would struggle to fund their new government following the withdrawal of U.S. and other donor nation financial support. He suggested that the resultant degradation of basic services and salaries for Afghan workers could ultimately force the Taliban to change their approach with the international community, but that it was too early to tell if the Taliban were reformed. 

Discussing the topic with NBC's Lester Holt, he expressed his belief that the Taliban's actions on the ground showed that they were "the same old Taliban", and that he was fairly confident that Al-Qaeda and the Islamic State would be able to re-establish sanctuaries in the region with the Taliban in power. He expressed doubt that the U.S. would become involved in the country while the Taliban was in power, outside of military and intelligence actions to protect U.S. interests, and suggested that even the establishment of an embassy for diplomatic relations would not happen "any time soon".

Views on the Russian invasion of Ukraine
Petraeus has been vocally critical of Russia’s 2022 invasion of Ukraine, joining three other retired military generals to form the Strategic Advisory Council for the Defense of Ukraine in July 2022 to provide strategic expertise and operational assistance to Ukrainian forces.

Early in 2022, as tensions mounted between Russia and Ukraine, Petraeus attended a tabletop panel with Admiral Michael Mullen, Michèle Flournoy, and Thomas Donilon to discuss economic sanctions, cyber defenses, and anti-Russian insurgency in Ukraine.

In public appearances and interviews, Petraeus has criticized not only Russia’s motives for the invasion, but also the tactics and standards of the country’s military effort. In the weeks following the invasion of Ukraine, Petraeus spoke with Jake Tapper and Anderson Cooper, examining Russia’s strategy in attempts to seize Kyiv. On March 12, 2022, Petraeus spoke on One Nation with Brian Kilmeade, criticizing the Russian military's failed attempt to achieve a combined arms effect, which, according to Petraeus, wasn’t up to the normal standards anticipated by the United States or other NATO countries’ militaries. In May 2022, Petraeus commented that, in an attempt to create a stronger Russia, President Putin had instead strengthened the alliance between NATO countries. In a later interview, Petraeus said that the Russian military was nowhere near as good as NATO had thought it would be. He described Russian military logistics as overwhelming artillery strikes, leading to the question of whether Russia's military valued volume over accuracy. In October 2022, he called Russia’s military mobilization in Ukraine “irreversible and disastrous.”

In addition to criticisms of Russia’s war effort, Petraeus also discussed the negative implications that Russian sanctions have for worldwide financial markets, food supplies, and other commodities, and he commended the Ukrainian military for its impressive counter-attacks, specifically a raid on Russian tanks, the killing of five Russian generals, and the destruction of the Russian warship, Saratov.

In mid- to late 2022, Petraeus spoke further on the Western response to Russia’s aggression and the impacts U.S. involvement had on Ukraine’s defense. In an interview with CNN’s Jim Sciutto regarding Russia's plans to annex more regions in Ukraine, he said that US- and UK-supplied high-mobility artillery rocket systems had prompted Russian forces to relocate their headquarters and fuel supplies, which had significantly slowed Russia’s advances in Ukraine. In another interview, he said that Western support had improved counteroffensive strategies, resulting in retaking Crimea and Donbas territories from Russia.

Petraeus has been a strong proponent of continued aid to Ukraine and increased NATO readiness for potential escalations by Russia and its allies. He spoke of the need for the United States to prioritize military readiness to counter China and to increase aid for Ukraine in the annual defense policy bill. He also discussed the importance of deploying Patriot missile systems in Ukraine as an anti-ballistic missile system and discussed measures that the US and NATO would employ if Russia were to carry out a nuclear attack in Ukraine. In an Atlantic Council discussion concerning additional aid to Ukraine he emphasized the need for the deployment of Western aircraft and support staff, a stronger defense guarantee, and diplomatic and economic pressures on Russia to hasten peace talks.

Petraeus expressed the belief that President Putin would eventually realize that the war is not sustainable on the battlefield and would agree to a negotiated resolution with Ukraine. In an article published by Foreign Policy magazine, Petraeus joined other experts to derive lessons from the Russian-Ukraine war that would prevent, deter, and combat forthcoming world conflicts.

Personal life
According to Petraeus, he does not vote in elections, having stopped following his promotion to major general in 2002 as part of a desire to be seen as apolitical. He has confirmed that he did not vote in the 2016 election.

Organizational memberships
 Co-chairman, Task Force on North America, Council on Foreign Relations (June 2013 – December 2015)
 Member, board of directors, Atlantic Council (April 2016 – present)
 Washington Speakers Bureau (June 2013 – present)
 Member, board of advisors, Team Rubicon (April 2013 – present)
 Member, board of directors, Optiv Inc (March 2017 – present)
 Co-chairman, global advisory council, Woodrow Wilson International Center for Scholars (August 2015 – present)
 Member, advisory council, Veterans Coalition for Common Sense (June 2016 – present)
 Member, conservation council, Panthera (February 2016 – present)
 Senior vice president, Royal United Services Institute (June 2013 – present)
 Member, board of directors, Institute for the Study of War (November 2013 – present)
 Member, advisory council, American Corporate Partners (April 2013 – present)
 Faculty advisor, USC Student Veterans Association (September 2013 – August 2019)
 Chairman, KKR Vets at Work (May 2014 – present)
 Member, board of directors, Iraq and Afghanistan Veterans of America (IAVA) (October 2015 – present)
 Member, Concordia Leadership Council, The Concordia Summit (September 2015 – present)
 Member, board of trustees, The McCain Institute for International Leadership (December 2015 – present)
 Member, academic advisory board, Warrior-Scholar Project (February 2016 – present)
 Advisor, Global War on Terror Memorial Foundation (February 2016 – June 2019)
 Member, national security advisory council, U.S. Global Leadership Coalition (April 2016 – present)
 Trustee, Arthur F. Burns Fellowship (April 2016 – present)
 Member, board of directors, Fort Campbell Historical Foundation (September 2015 – present)
 Member, board of advisors, The Alexander Hamilton Society (October 2016 – present)
 Member, board of advisors, Partnership for a Secure America (March 2017 – present)
 Churchill Fellow of Westminster College, Westminster College (Fulton, MO) (April 2017 – present)
 Member, council of advisors, Army Heritage Center Foundation (June 2017 – present)
 Member, Golden Plate Award Council, Academy of Achievement (October 2012 – present)
 Advisory trustee, The Camp Tocca At Currahee (June 2013 – present)
 Honorary chairman, The OSS Society (January 2013 – present)
 Honorary fellow, Ivy Club, Princeton University (May 2012 – present)
 Member, board of advisors, National Council on U.S. – Arab Relations (October 2016 – Present)
 Advisor to the board, United States-India Strategic Partnership Forum (January 2018 – present)
 Member, network experts (August 2018 – present)
 Member, board of advisors, Third Option Foundation (March 2019 – present)
 Member, The Trilateral Commission (August 2019 – present)

Recognitions and honors

Decorations and badges
Petraeus's decorations and badges include the following:

Honorary degrees
 Eckerd College, May 23, 2010, honorary doctorate in laws
 University of Pennsylvania, May 14, 2012, honorary doctorate of laws
 Dickinson College, May 20, 2012, honorary doctorate of public service
 American University of Afghanistan, June 17, 2019, honorary doctorate of humane letters

Civilian awards and honors
Petraeus's civilian awards and honors include:

2007–2010
 2007: 100 Most Influential Leaders and Revolutionaries of the Year, Time magazine
 2007: Second Most Influential American Conservative, The Daily Telegraph
 2007: Person of the Year 2007 runner-up, Time magazine
 2007: Man of the Year, The Daily Telegraph
 2008: Leader of the Year, GQ
 2008: One of World's Top 100 Public Intellectuals, Foreign Policy and Prospect magazines
 2008: 16th Most Powerful Person in the World, Newsweek
 2009: George R. Kennan Award, National Committee on American Foreign Policy
 2009: Distinguished Service Medal, The American Legion
 2009: Military Leadership Award, The Atlantic Council
 2009: Abraham Lincoln Award, Union League of Philadelphia
 2009: Father of the Year Award, National Father's Day Committee
 2009: Eisenhower Award, National Defense Industrial Association
 2009: William Donovan Award, Office of Strategic Services
 2009: Freedom Award, No Greater Sacrifice
 2009: Distinguished Citizen Award, Congressional Medal of Honor Society
 2009: Sam Gibbons Lifetime Achievement Award, The World Trade Center Tampa Bay
 2010: James Madison Medal, The Woodrow Wilson School
 2010: Leader of Principle Award, The Citadel at Baker School of Business
 2010: Irvine Kristol Award, American Enterprise Institute
 2010: Intrepid Freedom Award, Intrepid Sea, Air & Space Museum
 2010: Named No. 12 of 50 People Who Mattered in 2010, New Statesman
 2010: Top 100 Global Thinkers, Foreign Policy
 2010: Dwight D. Eisenhower, Veterans of Foreign Wars
 2010: Dedicated Room, Thayer Hotel

2011–2020
 2011: 100 Most Influential People in the World, Time magazine
 2012: Golden Plate Award, American Academy of Achievement
 2012: Gold Eagle Award, Society of American Military Engineers
 2013: 35th Chesney Gold Metal, Royal United Services Institute
 2013: History Makers Award, New-York Historical Society
 2013: Gold Medal for Distinguished Achievement, The Holland Society of New York
 2015: Luminary Award, WashingtonExec Leadership Council
 2016: C3 Global Solutions Award, C3 US-Arab Business and Healthcare
 2016: American Spirited Award, The Common Good
 2017: Winston S Churchill National Leadership Award, The International Churchill Society
 2018: Soldier Citizen Award, American College of Financial Services
 2019: Recanati-Kaplan Award for Civic Excellence and Cultural Engagement, 92nd Street Y
 2020: Currahee Crest Award, 506th Infantry Regiment

2021–present
 2021: Leadership Award, The Voices Center for Resilience
 2021: Top Voices in the Military Community, LinkedIn
 2022: Decoration Commemorating 200 Years of Diplomatic Relations Between the Republic of Colombia and USA Grade of Grand Cross, The Embassy of Colombia-US
 2022: American History Award, The Union League Club of New York
 2022: Sanctioned by Russia for support of Ukraine, Ministry of Foreign Affairs of the Russian Federation
 2022: Veteran Leadership Award, Iraq and Afghanistan Veterans of America

Additional recognition

In 2005, Petraeus was identified as one of America's top leaders by U.S. News & World Report.

In 2007, Time named Petraeus one of the 100 most influential leaders and revolutionaries of the year as well as one of its four runners up for Time Person of the Year. He was also named the second most influential American conservative by The Daily Telegraph as well as The Daily Telegraph 2007 Man of the Year. His Ph.D. dissertation, The American Military and the Lessons of Vietnam: A Study of Military Influence and the Use of Force in the Post-Vietnam Era, published by Princeton University in 1987, was number two on the list of best-selling dissertations in 2007.

In 2008, a poll conducted by Foreign Policy and Prospect magazines selected Petraeus as one of the world's top 100 public intellectuals. Also in 2008, the Static Line Association named Petraeus as its 2008 Airborne Man of the Year, and Der Spiegel named him "America's most respected soldier". As 2008 came to a close, Newsweek named him the 16th most powerful person in the world in its December 20, 2008, edition, and Prospect magazine named him the "Public Intellectual of the Year". He was also named as one of the "75 Best People in the World" in the October 2009 issue of Esquire.

On March 7, 2009, Petraeus received the Distinguished Citizen Award from the Congressional Medal of Honor Society at the Ronald Reagan Presidential Library.

Gen. David H. Petraeus, the top U.S. commander in the war against terrorism in the Middle East and Central Asia, was the spring commencement convocation speaker at Texas A&M University on May 13, a relatively new practice at Texas A & M.

On December 9, 2010, Barbara Walters picked Petraeus for the Most Fascinating Person of 2010. Walters called the top commander in Afghanistan "an American hero". Petraeus was chosen as "one of Time magazine's 50 "People Who Mattered" in December 2010. The same year he was named number 12 of 50 people who mattered in 2010 by the New Statesmen magazine, and Petraeus was listed as number 8 of 100 Foreign Policy Top 100 Global Thinkers for 2011.

The New Statesman annual survey presents the most influential people from pop stars and dissident activists to tech gurus and heads of state, the people doing most to shape our world keep changing. September 26, 2011, Petraeus was listed as number 2 of the 50 for 2011. The Association of Special Operations Professionals named Petraeus as its 2011 Man of the Year for 2011, and was presented the award at Ft. Bragg on November 2, 2011, at its annual Special Operations Exposition.

In January 2012, Petraeus was named one of "The 50 Most Powerful People in Washington" by GQ magazine. Petraeus was inducted January 29, 2012, into the Reserve Officers Association's (ROA) Minuteman Hall of Fame as the 2011 Inductee during the 2012 ROA National Security Symposium. The German Order of Merit was presented to Petraeus February 14, by the German Secretary of Defense Thomas de Maizière. According to de Maizière, he is an "outstanding strategist and a true friend of the German people". 

On March 16, 2012, the Dutch Minister of Defense Hans Hillen knighted Petraeus at the Hague with the Knight Grand Cross of the Order of Orange-Nassau with swords. The Minister thanked Petraeus in his speech for his, "unconditional support to the Dutch troops and for being a driving force behind a successful mission. Through his personal efforts for cooperation between the Netherlands and America, the Netherlands could achieve significant operational successes with the Task Force Uruzgan." 

In 2012, Petraeus received the Golden Plate Award of the American Academy of Achievement. The following year, in 2013, the New-York Historical Society established the Petraeus-Hertog Lecture Leadership Library series. Petraeus was featured alongside 18 other graduates of the United States Military Academy in West Point Leadership: Profiles of Courage, a collection of leadership biographies published in 2013."

Captured correspondence from Osama Bin Laden "Letters from Abbottabad" revealed that in May 2010, Bin Laden wanted to target President Barack Obama and General Petraeus. Bin Laden wrote: "The reason for concentrating on them is that Obama is the head of infidelity and killing him automatically will make Biden take over the presidency for the remainder of the term, as it is the norm over there. Biden is totally unprepared for that post, which will lead the U.S. into a crisis." It further went on to say, "As for Petraeus, he is the man of the hour in this last year of the war, and killing him would alter the war's path."

Petraeus and Dr. Henry Kissinger were the inaugural recipients of the Recanati-Kaplan Award for Civic Excellence and Cultural Engagement, presented by the 92nd Street Y on May 19, 2019. 92Y later established an Online Master Class in Leadership featuring a library series of lectures by Petraeus.

On November 19, 2020, General Petraeus became the first American military professional to deliver the annual Lee Knowles Lecture at Cambridge University's Trinity College. 

On December 7, 2020, the Institute for the Study of War launched "The General David H. Petraeus Center for Emerging Leaders" to offer new educational and professional development programs to its students. Petraeus has been on the board of ISW since November 2013.

Works by David Petraeus

Speeches, public remarks, interviews, and op-eds

 National Committee on American Foreign Policy George F. Kennan Award Acceptance Remarks. American Foreign Policy Interests, 31(4) July/August 2009.
 "The Foreign Policy Interview with Gen. David H. Petraeus", Foreign Policy January/February 2009.
 
 "The Surge: The Whole Story 2009.
 
 "Institutionalizing Change: Transformation in the US Army, 2005–2007", at the May 2010 American Enterprise Institute annual dinner.
 
 
 
 
 
 
 "Small Wars Journal Interview with General David H. Petraeus", Small Wars Journal (September 2013)
 
 
 
 
 
 
 
 "Fletcher Security Review Sits Down with Former ISAF Commander and CIA Director", May 2014.
 
 
 
 "Report Launch of the CFR-Sponsored Independent Task Force on North America", October 2, 2014
 "Petraeus and Zoellick urge U.S. to pay attention to North America", October 22, 2014
 
 "Petraeus: The Islamic State isn't our biggest problem in Iraq", The Washington Post (March 20, 2015)
 
 "Q & A David Petraeus GS '85 GS '87", The Daily Princetonian (June 2015)
 
 
 
 
 
 "Petraeus explains how jihadists could be peeled away to fight ISIS – and Assad" Jake Tapper of CNN; September 1, 2015
 "A Grand Strategy for 'Greater' Asia", the Lowy Lecture (September 2015)

Academic and other works

 
 Petraeus, David H. (1983). "What is Wrong with a Nuclear Freeze", Military Review v.63:49–64, November 1983.
 Petraeus, David H. (1984). "Light Infantry in Europe: Strategic Flexibility and Conventional Deterrence", Military Review v.64:33–55, December 1984.
 
 Petraeus, David H. (1986), "Lessons of history and lessons of Vietnam", Parameters (Carlisle, PA: U.S. Army War College) 16(3): 43–53, Autumn 1986.
 
 Petraeus on Vietnam's Legacy, Rachel Dry, The Washington Post, January 14, 2007, excerpts from Petraeus's doctoral dissertation, "The American Military and the Lessons of Vietnam".
 Clark, Asa A., Kaufman, Daniel J., and Petraeus, David H. (1987). "Why an Army?" Army Magazine v38(2)26–34, February 1987.
 Petraeus, David H. (1987). "El Salvador and the Vietnam Analogy", Armed Force Journal International, February 1987.
 
 
 Golden, James R.; Kaufman, Daniel J.; Clark, Asa A.; Petraeus, David H. (Eds) (1989), NATO at Forty: Change Continuity, & Prospects. Westview Press
 
 
 ,
 
 (2006) "Learning Counterinsurgency: Observations from Soldiering in Iraq", Military Review
 
 (2007) The U.S. Army/Marine Corps Counterinsurgency Field Manual (Foreword) "FM-3-24"
 (2007) "Beyond the Cloister", The American Interest Magazine
 
 
 Petraeus, David H. (2010) "Shoulder to shoulder in Afghanistan", Policy Options, April 2010.

See also

 Hood event
 Iraq War troop surge of 2007
 List of American federal politicians convicted of crimes
 MoveOn.org ad controversy

Notes and references

Further reading
 
 
 Robinson, Linda (2008). Tell Me How This Ends: General David Petraeus and the Search for a Way Out of Iraq. PublicAffairs. . plus Book Lecture at the Pritzker Military Library on November 22, 2008

External links

 
 
 
 FBI file on David Petraeus at the Internet Archive

|-

|-

|-

|-

|-

|-

1952 births
American people of Dutch descent
American people of Frisian descent
Atlantic Council
Commandants of the United States Army Command and General Staff College
Commanders of the Order of Merit of the Republic of Poland
Commandeurs of the Légion d'honneur
Counterinsurgency theorists
Directors of the Central Intelligence Agency
Honorary Officers of the Order of Australia
Knights Commander of the Order of Merit of the Federal Republic of Germany
Knights Grand Cross of the Order of Orange-Nassau
Living people
Military leaders of the Iraq War
Military personnel from New York (state)
Order of National Security Merit members
People from Cornwall, New York
Petraeus scandal
Princeton School of Public and International Affairs alumni
Recipients of the Defense Distinguished Service Medal
Recipients of the Defense Superior Service Medal
Recipients of the Distinguished Service Medal (US Army)
Recipients of the Humanitarian Service Medal
Recipients of the Legion of Merit
Recipients of the Meritorious Service Decoration
Recipients of the NATO Meritorious Service Medal
Recipients of the Polish Army Medal
United States Army generals
United States Army personnel of the Iraq War
United States Army personnel of the War in Afghanistan (2001–2021)
United States Military Academy alumni
Walsh School of Foreign Service alumni